Eleni is a transliteration of the Greek name Ελένη, also written as Helen, Helene:
 Eleni (given name), including lists of people with that name 
Eleni (film), 1985 film adaptation of Gage's book, by Peter Yates
, Greek cargo ship in service 1959–71

See also
Elaine (disambiguation)
Elena (disambiguation)
Ellen (disambiguation)
Helen (disambiguation)
Helen (given name)
Helena (disambiguation)
Helene (disambiguation)